Antto Tapaninen (born 16 June 1989) is a Finnish football player currently playing for Turun Palloseura. During the Veikkausliiga match against Tampere United on 23 April 2010, Tapaninen suffered a broken leg injury, which is estimated to keep him sidelined for at least three months.

References

External links

1989 births
Living people
JJK Jyväskylä players
Finnish footballers
Veikkausliiga players
Association football central defenders
Sportspeople from Jyväskylä
21st-century Finnish people